William Bentley (1759–1819) was an American Unitarian minister, scholar, columnist, and diarist.

William or Bill Bentley may also refer to:

William E. Bentley (born 1960), American academic
William Holman Bentley (1855–1905), English missionary
William Bentley (MP), Member of Parliament for Tavistock
William Bentley (novels)
 William Bentley, father of Derek Bentley
Bill Bentley (footballer) (born 1947), English former professional footballer
Bill Bentley (American football) (born 1989), American football cornerback
Bill Bentley (record producer) (born 1950), American music industry executive

Bentley, William